Aunty No 1 is a 1998 Bollywood action comedy film directed by Kirti Kumar and written by Kader Khan and Sachin Bhowmik. It stars Govinda, Raveena Tandon, Harish Kumar and Kader Khan .

Plot
Sandhya is in search of her prince charming and when Gopi realises this he pretends to be a rich prince Ranjit Sehgal, so Sandhya dates him. But soon she discovers that Gopi is a poor man but nevertheless they start loving each other. Meanwhile, Gopi's friends, Abhyankar and Raja, request Gopi to become an aunt for a big favour. He does so with hilarious results, as two men start loving him, leading to hilarious situations.

Cast
 Govinda as Gopi
 Raveena Tandon as Sandhya
 Harish Kumar as Abhyankar
 Rohit Kumar as Raja
 Raza Murad as Ram Nath, Kamalnath (dual role)
 Reema Lagoo as Vijayalaxmi
 Kader Khan as Rai Bahadur Behl
 Guddi Maruti as Asha
 Satish Kaushik as Mr. Pareshan
 Anupam Kher as Jyotish
 Saeed Jaffrey as Col. Dogra
 Narender Singh Bedi as Sardarji on scooter
 Mohnish Behl as Gaurav
 Bindu as Gopi's sister-in-law
 Lilliput as Servant
 Sadashiv Amrapurkar as Gopi's elder brother
 Eva Grover as Usha
 Mitra Joshi as Nisha

Box office
The film was unsuccessful at the box office.

Soundtrack
The music of this movie was composed by the duo Anand–Milind.

References

External links

1998 films
1990s Hindi-language films
Films scored by Anand–Milind
Cross-dressing in Indian films
Indian comedy films
Indian films based on plays
1998 comedy films
Hindi-language comedy films